Etsako East is a local government council in Edo State, Nigeria with its headquarters at Agenebode. It has an area of 1,133 km and a population of 145,996 at the 2006 census. The postal code of the area is 312.

References

Local Government Areas in Edo State